Mokotów is a city quarter of Warsaw, the capital of Poland.  It is densely populated, and is a seat to many foreign embassies and companies. Only a small part of the district is lightly industrialised (Służewiec Przemysłowy), while the majority is full of parks and green areas (Mokotów Field).

Although the area has been populated at least since the early Middle Ages, it was not until early 1916 when Mokotów was incorporated into Warsaw. The name of the area, first appearing as the village of Mokotowo in documents from the year 1367, has unclear origins. It is hypothesised to have come from the name of a German owner of the village, who called himself Mokoto or Mokot, however no exact reference to such an individual can be found in the historical records. Most of the area was urbanised and redeveloped throughout the 1930s in the style of modernism. The majority of the buildings survived World War II, making it one of the few well-preserved pre-war areas of Warsaw. Mokotów Prison is located within the borough. The residential real estate market in Mokotów, particularly in the neighbourhoods of Stary Mokotów and Wyględów, ranks among the most expensive in Warsaw.

Subdivisions of Mokotów

Administrative units

The following lower-level administrative units (osiedle) are established within Mokotow (they do not cover the whole district).

Sadyba
Służewiec Południowy (Southern Sluzewiec)
Służewiec Fort

Subdivisions

City Information System

Administratively defined in 1996, this district is divided into following areas:

 Stary Mokotów
  Sielce
  Czerniaków
  Siekierki
 Augustówka
  Sadyba
  Stegny
  Wierzbno
  Ksawerów
  Służew
  Służewiec
  Wyględów

Historical

While the following subdivisions have no formal, administrative status, they are recognised in everyday life.

Górny Mokotów (Upper Mokotow)
Stary Mokotów
Wierzbno
Ksawerów
Wyględów
Królikarnia
Służew
Służewiec
Służewiec Przemysłowy
Dolny Mokotów (Lower Mokotow)
Sielce
Czerniaków
Siekierki
Augustówka
Stegny
Sadyba

Gallery

External links

References